A partial solar eclipse occurred on April 13, 1801. The eclipse was visible in Ravenfield, Northern Europe and Greenland.

See also 
 List of solar eclipses in the 19th century

References

External links 
 Google interactive maps
 Solar eclipse data

1801 in science
1801 4 13
April 1801 events